Jane Austen's Emma is an adaptation of the 1815 novel of the same name. It was adapted for the British television network ITV in 1996, directed by Diarmuid Lawrence and dramatised by Andrew Davies, the same year as Miramax's film adaptation of Emma starring Gwyneth Paltrow. This production of Emma stars Kate Beckinsale as the title character, and also features Samantha Morton as Harriet Smith and Mark Strong as Mr. Knightley.

Davies had recently adapted another Austen novel as the successful 1995 television serial Pride and Prejudice for the BBC when he proposed to adapt the novel Emma for the network. The BBC, however, had already made such an agreement with another screenwriter, leading Davies to approach ITV.

Emma received generally positive reviews from critics, who believed it to be superior to the 1996 Miramax film. Most focused on Beckinsale's performance as a positive highlight. It aired on ITV on 24 November 1996 and garnered an estimated 12 million viewers. It also was broadcast on the American channel A&E on 16 February 1997.

Plot 

Miss Emma Woodhouse (Kate Beckinsale) of Hartfield lives in the small town of Highbury, and is young, pretty, and rich. Though she has decided she will never marry, Emma takes credit for matchmaking her friend and former governess, Miss Taylor, to the widower Mr. Weston. Emma decides to organize marriages for others of her acquaintance, despite friendly warnings not to meddle from Mr. Knightley, who is both an old friend, her brother-in-law, and the wealthy owner of Donwell Abbey. Emma resolves to marry her new friend, a pretty orphan named Harriet Smith, to the young vicar, Mr. Elton. This fails once Emma realizes to her horror that Elton desires to marry her instead.

New arrivals come to Highbury, including young orphan Miss Fairfax and Elton's new pretentious wife. Frank Churchill, the handsome son of Mr. Weston, also arrives generating interest and gossip. Emma, so sure of her ability to judge the feelings of others, believes that Frank wishes to marry her. Eventually the town discovers that Frank and Miss Fairfax have been secretly engaged, while Emma comes to recognize her true feelings for Mr. Knightley.

Cast 

 Kate Beckinsale as Emma Woodhouse
 Bernard Hepton as Mr. Woodhouse
 Mark Strong as George Knightley
 Samantha Morton as Harriet Smith
 Olivia Williams as Jane Fairfax
 James Hazeldine as Mr. Weston
 Samantha Bond as Miss Taylor/Mrs. Weston
 Raymond Coulthard as Frank Churchill
 Dominic Rowan as Mr. Elton
 Lucy Robinson as Mrs. Elton
 Prunella Scales as Miss Bates
 Sylvia Barter as Mrs. Bates
 Guy Henry as John Knightley
 Dido Miles as Isabella Knightley
 Alistair Petrie as Robert Martin

Production 
Andrew Davies adapted Jane Austen's 1815 novel Emma for television. Previously, he was the screenwriter for the successful 1995 BBC TV serial Pride and Prejudice starring Jennifer Ehle and Colin Firth. Davies offered to adapt Emma for the BBC, but it had already commissioned Sandy Welch as screenwriter. Michael Wearing, BBC head of drama serials, stated "It was a very, very difficult situation. I had already commissioned Sandy Welch, one of our BBC writers, to do Emma. We really were in a fix." In response, Davies and his team successfully made an offer to BBC's rival, ITV. Pride and Prejudices entire production team reportedly joined Davies when he began adapting Emma. It was his second adaptation of an Austen novel.

The production reportedly cost £2.5 million, and was shot during the summer of 1996.

Filming 
 Broughton Castle, Banbury – (Donwell Abbey)
 Sudeley Castle, Gloucestershire – (Donwell Abbey exteriors)
 Stanway House, Stanway, Gloucestershire, Cheltenham, Gloucestershire – (Donwell Abbey interior)
 Trafalgar Park, Salisbury – (Hartfield)
 Dorney Court, Dorney, Buckinghamshire – (Randalls)
 Lacock, Wiltshire – (Highbury Village)
 Thame Park, Oxfordshire – (Abbey Mill Farm, Hartfield interiors, etc.)

Themes and analysis 
Film critics have studied Emma for its depiction of class. In a contribution for the 2007 book Literary Intermediality: The Transit of Literature Through the Media Circuit, Lydia Martin noted that unlike the 1996 theatrical film starring Paltrow, Davies' Emma displays a "realistic, or even naturalistic, approach by focusing on the lower classes in which Jane Austen never really took any interest." Indeed, adds Carole Dole, "reminders of Highbury's class divisions are scattered throughout" the production. Davies provides social context with fleeting scenes of the lower classes in a neutral, educational way – unlike the 1995 film Persuasion, Emma does not encourage viewers to identify with the servants.

Release 
Emma was broadcast on 24 November 1996 on ITV, garnering an estimated 12 million viewers. Emma was also broadcast on the American channel A&E on 16 February 1997. It was released on DVD in 1999.

The adaptation re-aired in 2007, as part of ITV's Jane Austen Season, and as part of PBS Masterpiece's Jane Austen marathon on 23 March 2008. It was also aired on 27 December 2008, as a series of Christmas "specials" on BBC One.

Reception 
Many reviewers positively compared the TV drama to the 1996 feature film starring Paltrow. Peoples Tom Gliatto found it to be superior to the 1996 film, attributing this to Beckinsale's performance: "Paltrow played the part with a swanlike haughtiness. Beckinsale is vibrantly girlish and romantic. And she looks smashing in Empire-waist dresses." Gliatto also positively commented on Davies' script for "captur[ing] not just Austen's light charm but the pinpricks of her social criticism." Caryn James of The New York Times added that in a story with an unlikeable heroine, Beckinsale "walks [the] fine line beautifully... [She] is plainer looking than Ms. Paltrow's, and altogether more believable and funnier. She came to the role well prepared, after playing another socially self-assured comic figure in the recent film Cold Comfort Farm." James also lauded the screenplay for doing "a deft job of letting viewers pick up the social cues that Emma misses" and for indicating why Emma and Knightley are well-suited for each other.

Writing for The Washington Post, Megan Rosenfeld praised the production and especially saved positive comment for Beckinsale, whom she called perhaps "the best [Emma] of all" the previous adaptations of the novel. The actress, Rosenfeld opined, "looks at home in the dresses, cavernous houses and rolling countryside of Austen's 19th-century England, and yet seems modern in her alertness and in her way of not being intimidated by men. Her Emma gives you the confidence that any mischief she may get into can probably be undone." Gerard Gilbert of The Independent agreed, writing that Beckinsale "has the right mixture of sassiness, nosiness and self-satisfaction."

John Carman of the Los Angeles Daily News wrote that "at times, Emma seems to be a Melrose Place for the drawing-room set." He also noted it to be "scrumptiously filmed," calling it "a feast for the eyes and a balm for the heart." The Daily Herald however gave a negative review, and believed it was the worst of the three versions released. The reviewer still praised it for being "natural, faithful and likable," but criticized Strong as miscast. Davies, remarked the newspaper, "has written a pithy, direct Emma that, unlike his script for Pride and Prejudice, clocks in at a fraction of the time it takes to read the book."

Accolades

References

External links 
 
 

1996 television films
1996 films
British television films
ITV television dramas
Television shows based on works by Jane Austen
Films set in England
Films shot at Pinewood Studios
Television shows produced by Meridian Broadcasting
Television series by ITV Studios
Films based on Emma (novel)
1990s English-language films